Shamsi is a given name and a family name, which is commonly found in the Middle East, South Asia, and North Africa. People with this name include:

People with the given name Shamsi 
 Shamsi Ali (born 1967), Indonesian Muslim scholar
 Shamsi Asadullayev (1840–1913), Azerbaijani businessman and philanthropist
 Shamsi Badalbeyli (1911–1987), Azerbaijani theatre director
 Shamsi Fazlollahi (born 1941), Iranian actress
 Shamsi Hekmat (1917–1997), Iranian woman who pioneered reforms
 Shamsi Vuai Nahodha (born 1962) Tanzanian politician

People with the surname Shamsi 
 Baseer Shamsi (1922–2015), Pakistani soldier and cricketer
 Mir Shamsi, Indian mystic and a saint
 Tabraiz Shamsi, South African cricketer
 Tahir Shamsi (1962–2021), Pakistani physician
 Ahsan Shemsi (1967), Pakistani Researcher

Etymology
The word Shamsi means "of sun", "sunny", or "solar". The name can also mean "a disciple of Shams", in reference to communities in Pakistan, India and Syria that were descendent or converted to Islam by Sufi Saints, [Shaikh Shamsudin-Baray Sarkar and Shaikh Badar ud Din-Chotay Sarkar of Badaun UP, India 1206-1280 CE], Shamsuddin Sabzwari and Shahjamal Shamsul Arifeen (Aligarh).

See also
 Shamsi (disambiguation)
 Shams (disambiguation)
 Muslim Khatris

References

Arabic unisex given names
Persian given names
Persian-language surnames
Azerbaijani-language surnames
Surnames of Pakistani origin